Utopia Mountain is a  mountain located in the Miette Range of Jasper National Park, in the Canadian Rockies of Alberta, Canada. It was named by Morrison P. Bridgland in 1916. Bridgland (1878-1948) was a Dominion Land Surveyor who named many peaks in Jasper Park and the Canadian Rockies.


Climate
Based on the Köppen climate classification, Utopia Mountain is located in a subarctic climate with cold, snowy winters, and mild summers. Precipitation runoff from Utopia Mountain drains into tributaries of the Athabasca River.

See also
 Geography of Alberta

References

Mountains of Jasper National Park
Two-thousanders of Alberta